The 2010 McDonald's All-American Girls Game was an All-star basketball game played on Wednesday, March 31, 2010 at the Jerome Schottenstein Center in Columbus, Ohio, home of the Ohio State Buckeyes. The game's rosters featured the best and most highly recruited high school girls graduating in 2010.  The game was the 9th annual version of the McDonald's All-American Game first played in 2002.

The 48 players were selected from 2,500 nominees by a committee of basketball experts. They were chosen not only for their on-court skills, but for their performances off the court as well. Coach Morgan Wootten, who had more than 1,200 wins as head basketball coach at DeMatha High School, was chairman of the selection committee. Legendary UCLA coach John Wooden, who has been involved in the McDonald's All American Games since its inception, served as chairman of the Games and as an advisor to the selection committee.

Proceeds from the 2010 McDonald's All American High School Basketball Games went to Ronald McDonald House Charities (RMHC) of Central Ohio and its Ronald McDonald House program.

2010 Game
The 2010 game was played at Ohio State University's Jerome Schottenstein Center in Columbus, Ohio on March 31, 2010.

2010 West Roster
http://www.hoopfeed.com/content/2010/02/11/2010-mcdonalds-all-american-basketball-game-rosters-announced/

2010 East Roster

Coaches
The West team will be coached by:
 Co-Head Coach Dorena Bingham of East Anchorage High School (Anchorage, Alaska)
 Co-Head Coach Cathy Self-Morgan of Duncanville High School (Duncanville, Texas)
 Asst Coach  of 

The East team will be coached by:
 Co-Head Coach Scott Rodgers of Indian Hill High School (Cincinnati, Ohio)
 Co-Head Coach Dave Schlabach of Hiland High School (Berlin, Ohio)
 Asst Coach  of 

Boxscore

Visitors: West

Home: East

* = Starting Line-up

All-American Week

Schedule

 Monday, March 29: Powerade JamFest
 Three-Point Shoot-out
 Timed Basketball Skills Competition
 Wednesday, March 31: 9th Annual Girls All-American Game

The Powerade JamFest is a skills-competition evening featuring basketball players who demonstrate their skills in two crowd-entertaining ways.  The 3-point shooting challenge was first conducted in 1989, and the timed basketball skills competition was added to the schedule of events in 2009.

Contest Winners
 Maggie Lucas, Penn State Lady Lions signee, was winner of the 2010 3-point shoot-out. She scored 22 points in the final round to win the competition.
The winner of the basketball skills competition was Chelsea Gray.

See also
 2010 McDonald's All-American Boys Game

References

External links
McDonald's All-American on the web

2010 in American women's basketball
2010